Depestre is a surname. Notable people with the surname include:

Pedro Depestre (1945–2001), Cuban violinist, arranger, and musical director
René Depestre (born 1926), Haitian poet and former communist activist

See also
Delestre